The Ob (: Ob') is a major river in Russia. It forms at the confluence of the Biya and Katun which have their origins in the Altai Mountains. It is the westernmost of the three great Siberian rivers that flow into the Arctic Ocean (the other two being the Yenisei and the Lena). Its flow is north-westward, then northward.

The main city on its banks is Novosibirsk, the largest city in Siberia, and the third-largest city in Russia. It is where the Trans-Siberian Railway crosses the river.

The Gulf of Ob is the world's longest estuary.

Names
The internationally known name of the river is based on the Russian name Обь (Obʹ ). Possibly from Proto-Indo-Iranian *Hā́p-, "river, water" (compare Vedic áp-, Persian āb, Tajik ob, and Pashto obə, "water"). Katz (1990) proposes Komi ob 'river' as the immediate source of derivation for the Russian name. Katz's proposal of a common Finno-Ugric root, borrowed early on from a pre-Indo-Iranian source related to Sanskrit ambhas- 'water' is deemed improbable by Rédei (1992), who prefers to analyse this as a later loan from a descendant of the non-nasal root form *Hā́p-.

The Ob is known to the Khanty people as the As (the source of the name "Ostyak"), Yag, Kolta and Yema; to the Nenets people as the Kolta or Kuay; and to the Siberian Tatars as the Umar or Omass.

Geography

Both these streams have their origin in the Altai Mountains, which gradually give way to the Ob Plateau.

The Ob itself is in Russia. Its tributaries extend into northern Kazakhstan, a western corner of China and a tiny upland parcel of the western tip of Mongolia, where the wider borders match the drainage basin almost precisely. The river splits into more than one arm after the large Irtysh flows into it at about 69° E. Originating in China, the Irtysh is the furthest source of the Ob. From their respective sources to the confluence, the Irtysh measures 4,248 kilometers (2,640 mi) and the Ob 2,538 km (1,577 mi). Other noteworthy tributaries are: from the east, the Tom, Chulym, Ket, Tym and Vakh rivers; and, from the west and south, the Vasyugan, Irtysh (with the Ishim and Tobol rivers), and Severnaya Sosva.

The Ob zigzags west and north until it reaches 55° N, where it curves to the northwest, south of the Siberian Uvaly, at the western end of which it bends northwards, wheeling finally eastwards into the Gulf of Ob, a  bay of the Kara Sea, separating the Yamal Peninsula from the Gyda Peninsula.

The river basin of the Ob consists mostly of steppe, taiga, swamps, tundra, and semi-desert topography. The floodplains of the Ob are characterised by many tributaries and lakes.
The Ob River crosses several climatic zones. The upper Ob valley, in the south, supports grapes, melons and watermelons, whereas the lower reaches of the Ob are Arctic tundra. The most temperate climates on the Ob are at Biysk, Barnaul, and Novosibirsk.

Human use

The Ob provides irrigation, drinking water, hydroelectric energy, and fishing (the river hosts more than 50 species of fish).
There are several hydroelectric power plants along the Ob river, the largest being Novosibirskaya GES.

The importance of navigation in the Ob basin for transport was particularly great before the completion of the Trans-Siberian Railway, since, despite the general south-to-north direction of the flow of Ob and most of its tributaries, the width of the Ob basin provided for (somewhat indirect) transport in the east–west direction as well.

Until the early 20th century, a particularly important western river-port was
Tyumen, located on the Tura, a tributary of the Tobol. Reached by an extension of the Yekaterinburg-Perm railway in 1885, and thus obtaining a rail link to the Kama and Volga rivers in the heart of Russia, Tyumen became an important railhead for some years until the railway extended further east. In the eastern reaches of the Ob basin, Tomsk on the Tom functioned as an important terminus.

Tyumen had its first steamboat in 1836, and steamboats have navigated the middle reaches of the Ob since 1845. In 1916, there were 49 steamers on the Ob; 10 on the Yenisei.

The Trans-Siberian Railway, once completed, provided for more direct, year-round transport in the east–west direction. But the Ob river-system still remained important for connecting the huge expanses of Tyumen Oblast and Tomsk Oblast with the major cities along the Trans-Siberian route, such as Novosibirsk or Omsk. In the second half of the 20th century, construction of rail links to Labytnangi, Tobolsk, and the oil and gas cities of Surgut, and Nizhnevartovsk provided more railheads, but did not diminish the importance of the waterways for reaching places still not served by the rail.

A dam built near Novosibirsk in 1956 created the then-largest artificial lake in Siberia, called Novosibirsk Reservoir.
From the 1960s through 1980s, Soviet engineers and administrators contemplated a gigantic project to divert some of the waters of Ob and Irtysh to Kazakhstan and the Soviet Central Asian republics, replenishing the Aral Sea as well. The project never left the drawing board, abandoned in 1986 for economic and environmental considerations.

Pollution

Tributaries
The Irtysh is the major tributary of the Ob. The larger tributaries along its course are:

In addition, the Nadym and the Pur River flow into the Gulf of Ob and the Taz into the Taz Estuary, a side arm of the Gulf of Ob.

Cities
Cities along the river include:

Barnaul
Kamen-na-Obi
Novosibirsk (Russia's third largest city and Siberia's largest by population)
Kolpashevo
Langepas
Megion
Nizhnevartovsk
Surgut
Khanty-Mansiysk
Beryozovo
Labytnangi
Salekhard

Bridges

From a confluence to a source:
Surgut Bridge
Railway bridge in Surgut
Shegarsky bridge
The bridge of "northern bypass" of Novosibirsk
Dimitrov bridge in Novosibirsk
First railway bridge across the Ob (Trans-Siberian Railway)
Communal (October) bridge in Novosibirsk
Metro bridge in Novosibirsk – longest Metro Bridge in the world
Bugrinsky Bridge
Komsomol railway bridge in Novosibirsk
The bridge above the lock of Novosibirskaya HPP
Railway bridge in Kamen-na-Obi
Communal bridge (railway, automobile) in Barnaul
New bridge in Barnaul

See also

List of rivers of Russia

References

External links

The Top Ten: Longest Rivers of the World

 
Rivers of Altai Krai
Rivers of Khanty-Mansi Autonomous Okrug
Rivers of Novosibirsk Oblast
Rivers of Tomsk Oblast
Rivers of Yamalo-Nenets Autonomous Okrug
Rivers of Novosibirsk
Geography of Siberia
Braided rivers in Russia
West Siberian Plain